Bhutan Today, published in Thimphu, is the fourth English language newspaper published in Bhutan. It was launched in October 2008.

External links

Newspapers published in Bhutan
English-language newspapers published in Asia
Newspapers established in 2008
Dzongkha-language newspapers